Aile Arasında (Between Family) is a Turkish comedy film directed by Ozan Açıktan and written by Gülse Birsel. It stars Engin Günaydın, Demet Evgar, Erdal Özyağcılar, Devrim Yakut, Fatih Artman, Şevket Çoruh, Gülse Birsel, Derya Karadaş, Su Kutlu and Ayta Sözeri. It was released on 1 December 2017.

Plot 
Singer Solmaz and shopkeeper Fikret ("Fiko") have both just gotten out of 21-year relationships. Solmaz's has been dumped by her boyfriend (and the father of her daughter) and Fiko by his wife, who kicks him out. The two meet and Solmaz tells Fiko she can stay at her house until he gets back on his feet. At the same time, Solmaz's daughter Zeynep, a college student, gets engaged to her boyfriend Emirhan, but doesn't want his traditional, conservative family to find out her parents are unmarried and her father is gone. Solmaz convinces Fiko to pretend to be Zeynep's father and a police chief during the wedding. Fiko refuses at first because he's a terrible liar but eventually gives in. The wedding, originally supposed to be short and private affair, turns in a multi-day extravaganza thanks to the groom's family. Antics ensue.

Cast 
 Engin Günaydın - Fikret "Fiko"
 Demet Evgar - Solmaz
 Erdal Özyağcılar - Haşmet Kurt
 Devrim Yakut - Mükerrem Kurt
 Fatih Artman - Emirhan Kurt
 Şevket Çoruh - Necati "Neco" Balcılar
 Gülse Birsel - Mihriban
 Derya Karadaş - Leyla
 Su Kutlu - Zeynep Balcılar
 Ayta Sözeri - Behiye
 Devin Özgür Çınar - Gülümser Kurt
 Deniz Hamzaoğlu - Kahraman Kurt
 Rıza Akın - Muharrem Aladağ
 Arif Erkin - Dede
 Erdal Cindoruk - Ruhi
 Ünal Yeter - Okan

Production

Development 
The screenplay writer, Gülse Birsel, later said that she had developed the scenario over the course of 3-4 months.

Filming 
Aile Arasındas filming began on 26 August 2017. Istanbul shootings were carried out in a set in Silivri. Part of the shootings continued in Adana. The film was completed in seven weeks.

Release 

Aile Arasındas premiere was held on 28 November 2017 at Kanyon Shopping Mall in Istanbul. On 30 November 2017, a premiere ceremony was held in Adana's M1 Mall. The movie was released on 1 December 2017. On the same day, the cast appeared on Beyaz Show. On 2 December 2017, another ceremony for the movie was held at İzmir Optimum. The last promotional ceremony was organized on 4 December 2017 in Ankara at Panora Mall. Shown in seven hundred and fifty theaters throughout the country, the film was watched by 504,024 people in the first three days and had the fourth best opening of the year. In the first week of its release, the number of viewers reached 955,710 and it grossed 12.2 million. The movie was released on 7 December 2017 in Germany, Austria, Belgium, the United Kingdom, Denmark, France, the Netherlands and Switzerland. Two premiere ceremonies were held on 7 December 2017 in Cologne, and on 9 December 2017 in Amsterdam for the movie.

The movie was on the screens until 22 March 2018 and grossed ₺64,283,667 in total. It was later shown again in a number of theaters and its total gross rose up to ₺64,552,125. The movie was watched by 5,273,529 people in total and became the seventh most-watched movie of the year in Turkey.

Reception

Critical response 
Aile Arasında received generally positive reviews from critics. Writing for T24, Atilla Dorsay described the movie as a "real and clever comedy". In his review for Sözcü Burak Göral did not find any "innovation" in the movie but added that its scenario "does not surrender to the cheapness of the recent comedy films." Habertürk author Mehmet Açar commented on the film, which he considered to be "a fun comedy based on cultural conflicts," and is "over-packed with comedy material." Nil Kural from Milliyet described the movie as "a presentable comedy" with "Successful acting performances that are accompanied by an elaborate screenplay and directing, creating a mainstream comedy that we had not seen in a while". Writing for Hürriyet, Uğur Vardan said: "The scenario is somehow influenced by Avrupa Yakası and Yalan Dünya, and to some extent by The Birdcage, but in general it succeeds in making its audience laugh as a comedy movie." In his review for Posta, Kerem Akça wrote: "In spite of its shortcomings, it is hard to find such a good written and well-played family comedy in our commercial cinema." Sabahs Olkan Özyurt mentioned in his review that the film had not lived up to his expectations.

Accolades

References

External links 
 

2017 comedy films
Films shot in Istanbul
Films set in Istanbul
Turkish comedy films
2010s Turkish-language films